John Rothwell may refer to:

 John Rothwell (cricketer), Australian cricketer
 John Rothwell (physiologist), professor of neurophysiology
 John Rothwell (hurler) (born 1951), Irish retired hurler
 Arthur Uther Pendragon (John Timothy Rothwell, born 1954), English eco-campaigner, neo-druid leader, media personality, and self-declared reincarnation of King Arthur